Judith Serenge (born 21 January 1976) was a Kenyan female volleyball player. She was part of the Kenya women's national volleyball team.

She competed with the national team at the 2000 Summer Olympics, and 2004 Summer Olympics in Athens, Greece. She played with Kenya Pipelines in 2004.

Clubs
  Kenya Pipelines (2004)

References

External links
 Sports Reference
 nation.co
 amarillo.com
 fivb.org

1976 births
Living people
Kenyan women's volleyball players
Place of birth missing (living people)
Volleyball players at the 2000 Summer Olympics
Volleyball players at the 2004 Summer Olympics
Olympic volleyball players of Kenya